Joseph Patrick Francis Travers (10 January 1871 – 15 September 1942) was an Australian cricketer who played in one Test match in 1902. He played Australian rules football for Norwood in the South Australian Football Association (SAFA) during the 1890s.

After his cricket playing career was over, Travers gave much time and support to the administration side of the game. He died in 1942 after a long illness.

References

1871 births
1942 deaths
Australia Test cricketers
South Australia cricketers
Australian rules footballers from South Australia
Norwood Football Club players
Australian cricketers